Nickerson is a city in Reno County, Kansas, United States.  As of the 2020 census, the population of the city was 1,058.  It was named in honor of Thomas Nickerson, former president of Atchison, Topeka and Santa Fe Railway.

History
Nickerson was laid out in 1872 when the Atchison, Topeka and Santa Fe Railway was extended to that point. The first houses were built at the site in 1875.  Nickerson was incorporated as a city in 1879.

Geography
Nickerson is located at  (38.148508, −98.084154).

Climate
The climate in this area is characterized by hot, humid summers and generally mild to cool winters.  According to the Köppen Climate Classification system, Nickerson has a humid subtropical climate, abbreviated "Cfa" on climate maps.

Films
 Picnic (1955), the scenes at the Owenses' and the Pottses' houses were filmed in Nickerson.

Demographics

2010 census
As of the census of 2010, there were 1,070 people, 422 households, and 318 families residing in the city. The racial makeup of the city was 98.7% White, 0.4% African American, 0.1% Native American, 0.1% from other races, and 0.7% from two or more races. Hispanic or Latino of any race were 2.1% of the population.

There were 422 households, of which 32.2% had children under the age of 18 living with them, 55.7% were married couples living together, 13.0% had a female householder with no husband present, 6.6% had a male householder with no wife present, and 24.6% were non-families. 21.8% of all households were made up of individuals, and 10.4% had someone living alone who was 65 years of age or older. The average household size was 2.54 and the average family size was 2.91.

The median age in the city was 38.8 years. 26.2% of residents were under the age of 18; 7.1% were between the ages of 18 and 24; 24.4% were from 25 to 44; 26.5% were from 45 to 64; and 15.7% were 65 years of age or older. The gender makeup of the city was 50.7% male and 49.3% female.

2000 census
As of the census of 2000, there were 1,194 people, 460 households, and 333 families residing in the city. The racial makeup of the city was 96.40% White, 0.25% African American, 0.59% Native American, 1.01% from other races, and 1.76% from two or more races. Hispanic or Latino of any race were 2.85% of the population.

There were 460 households, out of which 36.1% had children under the age of 18 living with them, 58.3% were married couples living together, 10.2% had a female householder with no husband present, and 27.4% were non-families. 24.3% of all households were made up of individuals, and 10.2% had someone living alone who was 65 years of age or older. The average household size was 2.58 and the average family size was 3.03.

In the city, the population was spread out, with 28.6% under the age of 18, 8.2% from 18 to 24, 27.8% from 25 to 44, 22.2% from 45 to 64, and 13.1% who were 65 years of age or older. The median age was 36 years. For every 100 females, there were 99.0 males. For every 100 females age 18 and over, there were 92.8 males.

The median income for a household in the city was $33,269, and the median income for a family was $34,188. Males had a median income of $29,091 versus $18,313 for females. The per capita income for the city was $13,609. About 10.3% of families and 13.0% of the population were below the poverty line, including 15.8% of those under age 18 and 10.1% of those age 65 or over.

Government
 City Hall, 15 N. Nickerson St.

Education
The community is served by Nickerson–South Hutchinson USD 309 public school district.  The district's schools, which have an average enrollment of 350 students annually, include Nickerson High School and Nickerson Grade School.

Infrastructure

Transportation

Highway
K-96 state highway passes through Nickerson.  KDOT has proposed converting K-96 into a 4-lane highway and bypass the cities of Nickerson and Sterling.  Numerous routes have been studied.

Rail
The Kansas and Oklahoma Railroad passes through the city.

Gallery

References

Further reading

External links

 
 Nickerson - Directory of Public Officials
 Nickerson city map, KDOT

Cities in Kansas
Cities in Reno County, Kansas
Populated places established in 1872
1872 establishments in Kansas
Kansas populated places on the Arkansas River